Punnami Naagu is a 2009 Telugu language female-centric horror film directed by A. Kodandarami Reddy. Mumaith Khan plays dual roles as a  snakewoman and a city woman.

Cast 

 Mumaith Khan as the female snake / Honey, a model. People from the village think that Honey is a devadasi.
 Rajiv Kanakala as Rajiv
 Nizhagal Ravi as Honey's father who is a sincere police officer
 Suhasini as Kajal
 Srinivasa Reddy
 Nalini as Mayadevi Bhairavi, the witch
 M. S. Narayana as Kajal's uncle
 Aditya Om as Naagraj, the male snake
 Vinod Kumar as one of the poachers
 Madhusudhan Rao as one of the poachers
 Manobala as a police officer
 Shankar Melkote as Dr. Pallalokam
 Venu Madhav
 Tamil version
 Delhi Ganesh as a priest
 Adithya as a police officer
 Vennira Aadai Moorthy as a lawyer
 Aarthi as a police officer

Production  
A childhood scene regarding Mumaith Khan's character was shot in Tamil Nadu. The film was partially re-shot in Tamil as Pournami Nagam with director Yaar Kannan with Karunas portraying the male lead.

Reception 
Idlebrain gave the film a rating of one-and-a-half out of five and wrote that "[i]t is for the people who still want to see bhakti cinemas made on snakes".

Behindwoods also gave the film a rating of one and ahlf stars out of five and stated that, "The story is quite rundown and albeit falling in the fantasy genre fails to convince the viewer, or rather makes the viewer forget the fact that the plot is ridden with loopholes and devoid of any clever twist".

References 

2009 films
2000s Telugu-language films
Films about snakes
Indian films about revenge
Indian horror films
Films directed by A. Kodandarami Reddy
Films scored by S. A. Rajkumar
2009 horror films
Films about shapeshifting